Bragantino Clube do Pará, commonly referred to as Bragantino, is a Brazilian professional club based in Bragança, Pará founded on 29 January 1993. It competes in the Campeonato Paraense, the top flight of the Pará state football league.

Stadium
Bragantino play their home games at Diogão. The stadium has a maximum capacity of 5,000 people.

Rivalries
Bragantino's biggest rival is Caeté. The duel between the two clubs is called the Clássico da Farinha (Flour derby).

Honours
 Campeonato Paraense Second Division
 Winners (3): 2002, 2011, 2017

References

External links
 Official page on Facebook
 Bragantino on Globo Esporte

Football clubs in Pará
Association football clubs established in 1993
1993 establishments in Brazil